The Dodge Powerbox is a concept car created by Dodge. It was first introduced at the 2001 New York International Auto Show. The Powerbox demonstrated DaimlerChrysler's attempt in trying to improve hybrid automobiles.

The Powerbox uses a supercharged V6 engine that runs on compressed natural gas (CNG) in addition to an electric motor that boosts the acceleration of the Powerbox. The top speed of the Powerbox is 120 mph (193.1 km/h).

Some of the Powerbox's styling would be seen in the second-generation Durango, introduced in 2004.

References
Info on the Dodge Powerbox at ConceptCarz.com

Powerbox